Ludwig Stubbendorf (24 February 1906 – 17 July 1941) was a German horse rider who competed in the 1936 Summer Olympics. In 1936, he and his horse Nurmi won the gold medal in the individual eventing competition as well as in the team eventing.

References

External links
profile

1906 births
1941 deaths
People from Ludwigslust-Parchim
People from the Grand Duchy of Mecklenburg-Schwerin
German event riders
Olympic equestrians of Germany
German male equestrians
Equestrians at the 1936 Summer Olympics
Olympic gold medalists for Germany
Olympic medalists in equestrian
Medalists at the 1936 Summer Olympics
German military personnel killed in World War II